Acrocercops chloronympha is a moth of the family Gracillariidae, known from Brazil. It was described by E. Meyrick in 1921.

References

chloronympha
Moths of South America
Moths described in 1921